Hardan can refer to:

Hardan, Chaharmahal and Bakhtiari, a village in Iran
Hardan (Iraq), a village in Iraq
Assaad Hardan (1951), Lebanese politician and the leader of the Syrian Social Nationalist Party in Lebanon
Mohammed Al-Hardan, Bahreini footballer
Hardan al-Tikriti (1925-1971), senior Iraqi Air Force commander and politician

See also
Khardan (disambiguation)